is a Japanese footballer currently playing as a forward for Balestier Khalsa of the Singapore Premier League.

Career

Albirex Niigata (S) 
Hoshino signed his first professional contract for the White Swans after leaving Ryutsu Keizai University FC. By late July 2018, and with 3 more months to the end of the season, Hoshino's 18 goal tally has helped the White Swans wrap up the 2018 Singapore Premier League title. Hoshino eventually scored 19 goals that season and won the Top Goalscorer award.

Hoshino was also selected for the 2018 Sultan of Selangor Cup and scored in the match, which ended a 1-1 draw; with the Singapore selection losing 5-3 on penalties to Selangor.

Busan TC 
Hoshino played for Busan Transportation Corporation FC for the 2019 Korea National League season.

Balestier Khalsa 
Hoshino arrived back in the sunny shores of Singapore when Balestier Khalsa FC announced his signing for the 2020 Singapore Premier League season. Hoshino notched his first competitive Balestier goal in a 2-2 draw against his formal club in the second game of the season.

Career statistics

Club

Notes

References

1995 births
Living people
Association football people from Saitama Prefecture
Ryutsu Keizai University alumni
Japanese footballers
Japanese expatriate footballers
Association football forwards
Singapore Premier League players
Albirex Niigata Singapore FC players
Busan Transportation Corporation FC players
Balestier Khalsa FC players
Japanese expatriate sportspeople in Singapore
Expatriate footballers in Singapore
Japanese expatriate sportspeople in South Korea
Expatriate footballers in South Korea